"To Althea, from Prison" is a poem written by Richard Lovelace in 1642. The poem is one of Lovelace's best-known works, and its final stanza's first line "Stone walls do not a prison make, Nor iron bars a cage" is often quoted. Lovelace wrote the poem while imprisoned in Gatehouse Prison adjoining Westminster Abbey due to his effort to have the Clergy Act 1640 annulled.

Text 

Original text

Modernised spelling

Overview 
"To Althea, from Prison" was written by Richard Lovelace in 1642 as a result of Lovelace’s imprisonment. That year, Richard Lovelace presented a petition to the British parliament that protested the Bishops Exclusion Bill. The bill prevented those heavily involved with the Church of England from enacting any temporal control. Lovelace, on the other hand, protested that the role of Anglican Bishops that were excluded should be restored in Parliament.

Althea's identity is unknown. "She may even have been a product of Lovelace's imagination. However, evidence suggests she was a woman named Lucy Sacheverell." The poem is quoted in the sixth chapter of Charlotte Brontë's novel Villette, and may have inspired the scenario of Emily Brontë's much-admired poem "The Prisoner". It is also mentioned in Charlotte Smith's novel Marchmont, which has a protagonist named Althea. Margaret Atwood also quotes the famous lines in her novel Hag-Seed when Felix is bringing Anne-Marie into Fletcher Correctional Center (Ch 24, p. 145). Natalie Babbitt also uses a quotation from the poem in her novel Tuck Everlasting, when the main character Winnie Foster remembers the line "Stone walls do not a prison make, Nor iron bars a cage" while helping a jailed prisoner escape (Babbitt 123).

Musical settings and recordings 
The poem has been set to music by the British folk group Fairport Convention with music by Dave Swarbrick and features on their album Nine.  A highly regarded version likewise appeared on the album Morning Tempest (2000) by Jane and Amanda Threlfall and often features as a highlight/encore of their live performances. It has also been recorded by the folk group Three Pressed Men on their first album Daddy Fox as well as by the Churchfitters on their album New Tales for Old.  It was also set by American composer Thomas Avinger in 1960 as one in a set of songs from Lucasta Et Cetera for tenor and instrumental ensemble.  It is also suggested that American songwriter Robert Hunter drew inspiration from the poem for the song "Althea" performed by Jerry Garcia and the Grateful Dead.

See also
 To Lucasta, Going to the Warres
 1642 in poetry

References

Prison writings
17th-century poems
1642 works
1642 in England